Geyer is a German surname meaning "vulture". Notable people with the surname include:

 Andrea Geyer (born 1971), German-American multi-disciplinary artist 
 Bernadette Geyer (1968), American writer
 Bill Geyer (1919–2004), American football player
 Carl Geyer (1796-1841), German entomologist
 Celesta Geyer (1901–1982), American circus artist
 Dean Geyer, Australian singer and actor
 David Geyer (1855-1932), German malacologist
 Eduard Geyer (1944), German football manager
 Erich Geyer, German football (soccer) defender
 Florian Geyer (1490–1525), German folk hero
 Forest Geyer (1892), American football player
 Georgie Anne Geyer (1935–2019), American journalist and columnist
 Henry S. Geyer (1790–1859), American politician, lawyer, and soldier
 Hermann Geyer (1882–1946), German general
 John Geyer (1777–1835), mayor of Philadelphia
 Karl Andreas Geyer (1809–1853), German botanist
 Lee E. Geyer (1888-1941), American politician
 Ludwig Geyer (1779-1821), German actor, playwright and painter, stepfather of Richard Wagner
 Ludwig Geyer (cyclist) (1904-1992), German cyclist
 Manfred Geyer (1951), German biathlete
 Mark Geyer (1967), Australian rugby league footballer
 Matt Geyer (1975), Australian rugby league footballer
 Peter Geyer (1952), German football player
 Renée Geyer (1953–2023), Australian singer
 Stefi Geyer (1888–1956), Hungarian violinist
 Stephen Geyer (1950), American songwriter

See also
 Geyer (disambiguation)

German-language surnames
Surnames from nicknames